Miss Orton's Classical School for Girls was a private girls' school in Pasadena, California. The school, which was run by educator Anna Orton, opened in 1890. The school was designed to prepare girls for a higher education at a college in the Eastern United States, as most secondary schools in Pasadena at the time assumed their students would go to Stanford or Berkeley if they desired further education.

Curriculum

The school's college preparatory curriculum reflected a national shift in women's educational opportunities; until the late nineteenth century, girls' schools were mainly finishing schools or arts schools and were not academically equivalent to men's schools. Miss Orton's School was the first non-religious private girls' school in Pasadena, as well as the only such school in the city until 1913, making Orton a pioneer of women's education in Pasadena. The school closed in 1930.

Brief History

The first building at the school, which housed a single classroom, was constructed in 1892. A gymnasium was built at a later point, and a dormitory was constructed in 1900. A bungalow which served as Miss Orton's home was built in 1908. The buildings were designed by Frederick Roehrig in the Victorian Colonial Revival style; they were probably the only educational buildings designed by Roehrig, a significant Southern California architect. The classroom and gymnasium burned down between 1910 and 1925 and were replaced by a social hall. The dormitory is now the only building remaining at its original location; while the bungalow is also still at the site of the school, it was moved to a new foundation in 1947. The dormitory was added to the National Register of Historic Places on August 4, 1995.

Notable Alumnae
 Inez Asher, novelist and television writer

References

School buildings on the National Register of Historic Places in California
Buildings and structures on the National Register of Historic Places in Pasadena, California
Colonial Revival architecture in California
School buildings completed in 1900
Schools in Los Angeles County, California
Defunct girls' schools in the United States
1900 establishments in California
Girls' schools in California